Dinagat Islands (Cebuano: Mga Pulo sa Dinagat; Surigaonon: Mga Puyo nan Dinagat; Kabalian: Mga Puyo san Dinagat; Waray: Mga Purô han Dinagat; Filipino: Mga Islang Dinagat), officially the Province of Dinagat Islands, is an island province in the Caraga region of the Philippines, located on the south side of Leyte Gulf. The island of Leyte is to its west, across Surigao Strait, and Mindanao is to its south.

History

The province is known as one of the archipelago's holiest sites in the Pre-Christian native religion. It is here where the God of Hurricanes was persuaded to relent his attacks on the islands by Da, the God of Peace. The province in pre-colonial times was much influenced by the Rajahnate of Butuan which was nestled in present-day Agusan del Norte. It was also used as the entry point of the Rajahnate of Ternate, present-day Moluccas of Indonesia, to attack the Rajahnate of Butuan, Rajahnate of Cebu, the indigenous settlements in the Anda Peninsula of Bohol, and the Kingdom of Dapitan (located 'between' Panglao and Bohol), which later moved in northern Zamboanga after the Kingdom of Dapitan was destroyed.

Although one of the newest provinces of the country, settlements in the Dinagat Islands were already present during the Spanish regime as a result of migration of people from nearby provinces of Bohol and Leyte. The so-called mystical province played an important role in the country's history, particularly during World War II.

The municipality of Dinagat is the oldest community in the province. In the early days, a story was told that a stranger reached the place in search of greener pastures. He approached a native and asked what the inhabitants do for a living. The natives said that they farm and fish to live. The stranger's interest in fishing prompted him to inquire where they fish, and the native replied and pointed to a place saying dinhi niini na dagat (here from this bountiful waters). Since then, the place was called "Dinagat".

The municipality was formally established in 1855. It occupies the territorial boundaries of the whole island. From 1890 to 1990 its boundaries were gradually reduced giving rise to six municipalities, Loreto, Cagdianao, Libjo, Basilisa, Tubajon and San Jose.

Loreto became a Spanish pueblo on September 4, 1890, under the supervision of Governor General Manuel Sanchez by the virtue of Direccion General No. 30. It was originally called Mabua due to the ever-foaming river that runs right into the center of the community. It was named Loreto in 1881 by the Spanish priest who frequents the town, in honor of the wife of the Alcalde Mayor of the Province of Surigao.

The province was the site of the historic Battle of Surigao Strait during the Second World War. The Municipality of Loreto became the entry point of the American Liberation Forces on October 17, 1944. It was on this shore that the 6th Ranger Battalion of the 6th U.S. Army under Col. Mucci landed at Sitio Campintac of Barangay Panamaon in Loreto. It was during this landing that the first American flag flew on Philippine soil since the Japanese invasion in 1941. The Americans named the place "Black Beach No. 2."

The northern part of the island served as a refuge for the American soldiers, while the western border was held by Japanese forces. Capsized vessel structures are still found today in the waters of Basilisa.

On December 23, 1959, Cagdianao was created into a municipality under Executive Order No. 367. Its name came from the Spanish word Cada dia linao meaning "everyday peaceful and calm". However, some scholars say that its name came from the Visayan word Taga Danaw meaning "the lake people".

Libjo was created into a municipality and named Albor on February 29, 1960, under Executive Order No. 381. It was taken from the municipalities of Dinagat and Loreto. Albor came from the surname of the mayors of Loreto and Dinagat — Alfaro and Borja. It was renamed as Libjo on June 17, 1967. The name came from the word Liboo, a kind of mussel clam.

In 1965, Ruben Edera Ecleo Sr. founded the Philippine Benevolent Missionaries Association (PBMA) at Sitio Puyange, now Poblacion in San Jose. PBMA is a non-sectarian organization bounded by a strong spirit of brotherhood. Not long after that, members from all over the Philippines migrated to the island to be in constant association with their founder.

Meanwhile, Basilisa became a municipality on June 17, 1967, under Republic Act No. 4986. It was then named as Rizal, after the country's national hero. The municipality was renamed as Basilisa on June 21, 1969, under Republic Act. No. 5775.

Tubajon, which was once a barangay of Loreto, became a municipality on June 21, 1969, under Republic Act No. 5643.

The newest municipality is San Jose, created on November 15, 1989, under Republic Act No. 6769. The town was named in honor of Jose Ecleo who was its pioneer and father of then mayor of the municipality of Dinagat, Ruben Edera Ecleo Sr. The town is the seat of the PBMA.

The Dinagat Islands was part of the First District of Surigao del Norte Province until it became a province on December 2, 2006, with the approval of Republic Act No. 9355 (authored by Rep. Glenda B. Ecleo), the Charter of the Province of the Dinagat Islands, in a plebiscite. President Gloria Macapagal Arroyo appointed the province's first set of officials on January 26, 2007. Provincial officials were first elected a few months later, in the May 14, 2007 elections; these elected officials took office on July 1, 2007.

On February 11, 2010, the Supreme Court of the Philippines declared the creation of the Dinagat Islands Province null and void on grounds of failure to meet land area and population requirements for the creation of local government units. The decision was not yet rendered final and executory before the May 10, 2010 elections; therefore the Commission on Elections still organized the elections for the province's separate congressional representative and provincial officials. Although the original decision was made final and executory on May 18, 2010—thereby reverting the Dinagat Islands to Surigao del Norte—the officials elected in 2010 continued to serve the province, even throughout the legal battles that followed, which eventually saw the Supreme Court reverse its position.

On April 12, 2011, the Supreme Court reversed its earlier ruling, upholding the constitutionality of Republic Act No. 9355 and validating the creation of Dinagat Islands as a province. An Entry of Judgment on October 24, 2012, ended the legal battles surrounding the status of the province, and finalized the separation of Dinagat Islands from Surigao del Norte.

Geography
It takes about 45 minutes to cross Surigao City Port to San Jose Port by pump boat.

The province consists of the eponymous Dinagat Island and surrounding islands and islets, including Cabilan Island in Dinagat, La Isla Aga and Lalaking Bukid in Basilisa, Kisses Islets in Libjo, and Hibuson, Stingray Islet, and Puyo Islet in Loreto.

Climate change 
The Dinagat Islands province is among the top 20 most vulnerable provinces to climate change in the Philippines.

Administrative divisions

The Dinagat Islands province comprises seven municipalities, all encompassed by a single legislative district.

Demographics

The original inhabitants of the province are called "Lumad", while residents of the Dinagat Islands are called "Dinagatnon". The Dinagat Islands is predominantly a Cebuano-speaking province. However, towns facing the Surigao del Norte maritime border are Surigaonon-speaking, particularly the municipalities of Dinagat and Cagdianao due to their proximity to the province of Surigao del Norte. Barangay Panamaon and the historic Hibuson Island in Loreto speak Waray-Waray. Influences of the Cebuano and Boholano languages with a Tausug accent can be traced. Most can also speak various levels of Tagalog and English.

Religion
Religious breakdown in the province shows Roman Catholicism at majority with 53% adherence while Iglesia Filipina Independiente or Aglipayan is the significant minority religion at 23%. Other minority religions are the Church Body of Christ- Filipinistas (12%), United Church of Christ in the Philippines (4%), Iglesia ni Cristo (3%) and other smaller Christian groups (Dinagat Island Socio Economic Factbook, 2007).

Recent cultural, religious and socioeconomic changes of the province have allowed the rebound of Roman Catholics (and Aglipayans in some degree) and their numbers have constantly increased; the province had experienced a Catholic decline in several decades (1970s-early 2000s) due to immigration of the members of Philippine Benevolent Missionaries Association in the 1960s. There were some decades (1990s-2000s) where Roman Catholics became minority with as low as 37% of the population.

Several religious conflicts were recorded in the province. But at present, religious harmony is relatively observed in most parts of Dinagat Island.

Government
The Governor of the Dinagat Islands is the local chief executive of the province of the Dinagat Islands.

The Representative of the Dinagat Islands is the congressperson of the province of the Dinagat Islands in the House of Representatives.

Economy

Tourism

Dinagat Islands is a young island-province at the northern tip of Mindanao. Many describe Dinagat Islands as a hidden gem of the Caraga Region XIII. The Islands are enriched with great bio-diversity, abundant natural wonders and rich resources. Dinagat Islands has a multitude of fascinating white sandy beaches with arrays of colossal rock formations. These sites and attractions are as diverse as the topography of the islands and islets.

The province is known for its caves, resorts, and beaches. These include Bitaug Beach, Campintac Black Beach No. 2, Linao Spring Resort, and San Juan Cave (all in Loreto), Lake Bababu, Puerto Prinsesa Beach & Hagakhak Cave in Basilisa, Tagberayan Beach, Sayaw Beach, Legaspi Water Falls, Hinabyan and Leandro's Beach Resort in Cagdianao, Talisay Beach in Tubajon, Quano Blue Lagoon and Quano Cave, Ben Paz Mountain Resort and Oasis Islet Resort in Libjo, and the Cab-ilan Beach & Cab-ilan Gamay Beach in Dinagat.

Environment and wildlife

The Dinagat Islands is one of the most environmentally significant provinces in the Philippines, where endemism of fauna is unique in its region. Animals that are endemic to the province include the critically endangered Dinagat bushy-tailed cloud rat that was rediscovered in 2012 after decades of disappearance, the endangered Dinagat hairy-tailed rat, Dinagat gymnure that has been declared by the EDGE Species Programme of the Zoological Society of London as one of the top 100 most evolutionary distinct and globally endangered species in the world, and a strange sub-species of the Philippine Tarsier that is unusually larger and darker in color than the common Philippine tarsier. The province is highly forested and is considered as a Key Biodiversity Area by Haribon Foundation and the Department of Environment and Natural Resources of the Philippines because of its unique fauna and flora, along with its lush rainforests that are classified as primary forests, or forests that have never been fully obliterated since pre-colonial times.

References

External links

 
 
 Charter of the Province of Dinagat Islands (Republic Act No. 9355)

 
Provinces of the Philippines
Provinces of Caraga
Archipelagoes of the Philippines
Archipelagoes of the Pacific Ocean
Islands of Mindanao
Island provinces of the Philippines
States and territories established in 2006
2006 establishments in the Philippines